The Series C Banknotes of Ireland were the final series of notes created for the state before the advent of the euro; it replaced Series B banknotes. The series gradually entered circulation from 1992 and remained in circulation until 2002.

Banknotes
The notes were commissioned by the then Central Bank of Ireland, in five denominations. The Central Bank held a limited competition in 1991 and invited nine Irish artists having decided on the theme previous to invitation. The designs of Robert Ballagh were chosen, and his designs were used in all the denominations to follow a unified design pattern.

The theme for this series was people who contributed to the formation of a modern Ireland, and to this effect it includes politicians, a language, literary and religious figure.

These notes incorporated a number of sophisticated features for security, and the partially sighted and blind; such features had not previously seen on banknotes in Ireland.

Five Pounds
The front of the note features Catherine McAuley who founded the Sisters of Mercy, the background features the Mater Misericordiae Hospital, Dublin which was founded by the Sisters of Mercy. The resemblance to BBC sports commentator Barry Davies was parodied on "They think it's all over".

The back of the note features three children in a classroom. The first verse of the Irish poem Mise Raifteirí an File by Antoine Ó Raifteiri is presented on the blackboard in Gaelic script. A map of Europe, without political boundaries, is at the back.

Ten Pounds
The front of the note features James Joyce; the background features Dublin and Wicklow, particularly Dublin Bay.

The back of the note features one of the heads on The Custom House, Dublin by Edward Smyth. The head is one of fourteen and believed to represent the River Liffey. A nineteenth century map and part of "Finnegans Wake" also feature.

Twenty Pounds
The front of the note features a portrait of Daniel O'Connell, who served as Dublin's Lord Mayor from 1841 to 1842; the background features Derrynane Abbey, County Kerry. The brick detail in the building is '£20' printed repeatedly. This was an added security feature that was often missed by prospective counterfeiters.

The back of the note features a pledge signed in 1845 by early Irish statesmen, with the Four Courts in the background.

Fifty Pounds
The front of the note features Douglas Hyde, first President of Ireland; the background features Áras an Uachtaráin set against the interior of the base of the Ardagh Chalice.

The back of the note features a piper and the seal of Conradh na Gaeilge. An excerpt from a sixteenth-century manuscript kept by the Royal Irish Academy also features.

One Hundred Pounds
The front of the note features Charles Stewart Parnell; the background depicts a view of his residence Avondale House of Rathdrum, County Wicklow. A hound also features.

The back of the note features part of the Parnell Monument, O'Connell Street, Dublin. The signature of Parnell is the one which he used in response to the Home Rule Bill.

References

Sources
 Series C (1992/96 – 2000) Famous Irish Historical Figures

Currencies of the Republic of Ireland
Ireland C